Charles Anthoney (15 April 1902 – 1982) was an English professional footballer who played Football League for Mansfield Town and Northampton Town.

References

1902 births
1982 deaths
English footballers
Association football defenders
English Football League players
Mansfield Town F.C. players
Northampton Town F.C. players